The Luna Sharpshooters, also known as the "Marksmen of Death" (Spanish: Tiradores de la Muerte), was an elite unit formed by General Antonio Luna to serve under the Philippine Revolutionary Army. They became famous for fighting fiercer than the regular Filipino army soldiers. Most of the members of this unit came from the old Spanish Army which fought during the Philippine Revolution.

History
On February 11, 1899, eight infantrymen, formerly under Captains Márquez and Jaro, were sent by Secretary of War Baldomero Aguinaldo to Luna, then Assistant Secretary of War. The infantrymen were disarmed by the Americans. So, they journeyed to be commissioned in the regular Filipino army. Seeing their desire to serve in the army, Luna took them in and from there their group grew and emerged as the Luna Sharpshooters.

The sharpshooters became famous for their fierce fighting and proved their worth by being the usual spearheading unit in every major battle in the Philippine–American War. After the Battle of Calumpit from April 25 to 27, 1899, only seven or eight of them remained in the regular Filipino army. In the Battle of Paye on December 19, 1899, Bonifacio Mariano, a sharpshooter under the command of General Licerio Gerónimo, killed General Henry Ware Lawton, making the latter the highest ranking casualty during the course of the war.

Related units
During the war, Luna also formed other units similar to the sharpshooters. One would be the unit commanded by Rosendo Simón de Pajarillo called Los Bandoleros. The unit emerged from a group of ten men wanting to volunteer in the regular Filipino army. Luna, still thinking of the defeat at the Battle of Caloocan, sent the men away at first. However, he soon changed his mind and decided to give the men an initiation. After taking breakfast, he ordered a subordinate, Colonel Queri, to prepare arms and ammunition for the ten men. Then, the men boarded a train destined towards Malinta, which was American-held territory. After giving orders to the men, he let them go and watched them with his telescope. The men, succeeding their mission, eventually returned unharmed. Admiring their bravery, he organized them into a guerrilla unit of around 50 members. This unit would see action in the Second Battle of Caloocan.

Another unit would be the Guardia Negra (Black Guard), a 25-man guerrilla unit under a Lieutenant García. García, one of Luna's favorites, was a modest but brave soldier. His unit was tasked to approach the enemy by surprise and quickly return to camp. Luna had admired García's unit very much that he wanted to increase their size. However, García declined the offer. Jose Alejandrino, the chief army engineer and one of Luna's aides, stated that he never heard of García and his unit again after Luna's resignation on February 28.

References

Military units and formations established in 1899
Special forces of the Philippines